The mass media in Equatorial Guinea is primarily run by the state.  Radio and Television Asonga (see below) are not officially run by the state, but by people close to the administration.

Print
Newspapers published in the Spanish language include:

El Tiempo 
La Opinión 
La Gaceta 
El Ebano 
La Verdad
La voz del pueblo

Radio
There are three state-run radio stations:
Radio Malabo
Radio Bata
Voie de Kie Ntem
There is a radio station run by the son of the president:
Radio Asonga

Television
There exist two state-run television stations, one in Malabo (TVGE) and one in Bata.

In addition, Television Asonga broadcasts from Malabo.

Subscription television channels from Spain (such as Fox, La 1, MTV, Disney Channel, among others) are received by the population via cable and satellite TV providers.

Freedom of speech

Internet Media
GuineaInfoMarket - Diario de Información económica de Guinea Ecuatorial
AHORAEG Guinea Ecuatorial - Diario online líder de noticias

See also
 Communications in Equatorial Guinea

References
Equatorial Guinea Touristic Guide
International Press Institute::World Press Freedom Review::Equatorial Guinea

 
Equatorial Guinea
Equatorial